Sanctuary of Beata Vergine del Fiume is a Roman Catholic church in the town of Mandello del Lario, in the Lecco and the region of Lombardy, Italy.

See also
Catholic Church in Italy

References

External links

Mandello
Mandello del Lario
Baroque church buildings in Lombardy